R. Ponnappan Nadar or R. Ponnappa Nadar (11 April 1921 – 12 October 1976) was an Indian politician who served as a Congressional leader from the Kanyakumari district and a Member of the Legislative Assembly.

Early life and education
Nadar was born on 11 April 1921, and attended St. Antony's Elementary School, Munchirai Government Middle School, and Eraniel Higher Secondary School. He completed his ESLC examination in 1937.

Nadar completed his B.A. degree at the Thiruvananthapuram Maharaja College in 1942. He later completed his degree in law in 1944 at the Thiruvananthapram College of Law.

Career
Nadar's brother-in-law introduced him to law by enabling him to work as a junior lawyer under the guidance of his family lawyer.

He was elected as a Member of the Legislative Assembly of Travancore-Cochin Legislative Assembly in 1952 from Killiyur constituency by defeating A. Gabriel of Congress. He received 17,084 votes against 2,718 votes for Gabriel. The total number of valid votes cast in the election was 25,512. He won the interim election in 1954 from the same constituency against Gabriel.

He was elected to the Tamil Nadu legislative assembly three times after Kanyakumari district merged with Tamil Nadu. He was elected from Killiyur constituency in 1962 election, and from Vilavancode constituency  in 1967 and 1971 elections.

Personal life
Nadar married Roselet, on 11 November 1949. They had six children, one of whom is also a politician. He died on 12 October 1976 in an aircraft accident en route to Chennai.

References 

People from Kanyakumari district
Indian National Congress politicians from Tamil Nadu
Indian National Congress (Organisation) politicians
Leaders of the Opposition in Tamil Nadu
Travancore–Cochin MLAs 1952–1954
Travancore–Cochin MLAs 1954–1956
Madras MLAs 1962–1967
Tamil Nadu MLAs 1967–1972
Tamil Nadu MLAs 1971–1976
1921 births
1976 deaths